Morgan Williams (born 30 August 1999) is an English professional footballer who plays for Yeovil Town, as a defender.

Career
Williams began his football career in the youth system of Nottingham Forest before being released at under-15 level. After a few years out of the game Williams joined the youth team of non-league Mickleover Sports in September 2016. On 22 April 2017, Williams made his Northern Premier League Premier Division debut for Mickleover against Frickley Athletic. After being named in the 2017–18 Northern Premier League team of the season, Williams signed for Coventry City for a fee of £12,000 plus add-ons in July 2018.

He made his senior debut on 12 September 2018 in a 3-0 defeat against Arsenal U21 in the EFL Trophy, coming on as a substitute in the 61st minute for Dujon Sterling.

On 7 December 2019, Williams joined National League side Yeovil Town on loan until 4 January 2020. Williams returned to Yeovil Town on a one-month loan deal in October 2020.

On 12 May 2021 it was announced that he would leave Coventry at the end of the season, following the expiry of his contract. Following his release from Coventry, Williams signed permanently for National League side Yeovil Town on a two-year deal.

Career statistics

References

1999 births
Living people
English footballers
Nottingham Forest F.C. players
Mickleover Sports F.C. players
V9 Academy players
Coventry City F.C. players
Yeovil Town F.C. players
Association football defenders
Northern Premier League players
English Football League players
National League (English football) players